Norberto Méndez may refer to:

 Norberto Doroteo Méndez (1923–1998), Argentine footballer
 Norberto Méndez (canoeist) (born 1971), Argentine sprint canoer